The Game Crafter, LLC (TGC) is a Madison, Wisconsin-based company that produces tabletop game components and custom print on demand card games and board games.

History
The company was founded in 2001 by J.T. Smith, Jamie Vrbsky, and Tavis Parker. In July 2009 the company launched a web-based print on demand game publishing service that allows game designers to build and print custom card games and board games through a web-based system. In 2021, The Game Crafter was nominated for the Diana Jones Award.

References

Further reading

External links 

The Game Crafter, LLC on Board Game Geek

Board game publishing companies
Card game publishing companies
American gaming websites
Board game websites
Companies based in Madison, Wisconsin
Publishing companies established in 2001
Trading card companies